Kate Maclean (born 16 February 1958, Dundee) is a Scottish Labour Party politician.  She was the Member of the Scottish Parliament (MSP) for the Dundee West constituency from 1999 to 2007.

Kate was educated at Craigie High School, Dundee and became a councillor in 1988. Prior to her election she had been leader of the Dundee City Council from 1992. Kate was also vice-president of Convention of Scottish Local Authorities (COSLA) between 1996 and 1999.

Although selected by Labour as a candidate for the 2007 Scottish Parliament election, Kate announced in June 2006 that she would instead not seek re-election. The Dundee West seat was taken by Joe FitzPatrick of the Scottish National Party at the 2007 election.

References

External links 
 
 Kate Maclean MSP profile at the site of Scottish Labour

1958 births
Living people
Labour MSPs
Members of the Scottish Parliament for Dundee constituencies
Female members of the Scottish Parliament
Members of the Scottish Parliament 1999–2003
Members of the Scottish Parliament 2003–2007
Scottish Labour councillors
Councillors in Dundee
20th-century Scottish women politicians
Women councillors in Scotland